Despedazado por Mil Partes is a 1996 studio album by La Renga.

This record has many of the most famous songs of the band, such as "La Balada del Diablo y La Muerte", "El Final Es En Donde Partí", "Lo Frágil de La Locura", "Veneno" and "Hablando de La Libertad", which closes their concerts.

The front cover of the album shows an angel, which when turned upside down, appears as a demon.

Track listing
All songs by Gustavo Nápoli, except "Veneno" (Marcelo Ferrari):

 "Desnudo Para Siempre (o Despedazado por Mil Partes)"
 "A La Carga Mi Rocanrol"
 "El Final Es En Donde Partí"
 "La Balada del Diablo y La Muerte"
 "Cuándo Vendrán"
 "Psilocybe Mexicana"
 "Paja Brava"
 "Lo Frágil de La Locura"
 "Veneno"
 "El Viento Que Todo Empuja"
 "Hablando de La Libertad"

Personnel
Chizzo - lead vocals, lead guitar
Tete - bass guitar
Tanque - drums
Chiflo - saxophone, trumpet
Manu - saxophone, harmonica

Additional personnel
Tony Peluso - recording technician, mixing, mastering
Gabriel Goncalvez - manager
Estudio Del Federico - artwork
Marcelo Zeballos - illustrations

Certification

See also
List of best-selling albums in Argentina

References

1996 albums
La Renga albums